Peridea ferruginea, the chocolate prominent, is a species of prominent moth in the family Notodontidae. It was described by Alpheus Spring Packard in 1864 and is found in North America. In 2018, Miller et al. distinguished Peridea bordeloni, whose larvae specialize on river birch Betula nigra, as a separate species, though  P. bordeloni has previously been identified as P. ferruginea.

The MONA or Hodges number for Peridea ferruginea is 7921.

References

 Lafontaine, J. Donald & Schmidt, B. Christian (2010). "Annotated check list of the Noctuoidea (Insecta, Lepidoptera) of North America north of Mexico". ZooKeys. 40: 1-239.

Further reading

 Arnett, Ross H. (2000). American Insects: A Handbook of the Insects of America North of Mexico. CRC Press.

Notodontidae